The Ministry of Aviation is a ministry responsible for overseeing air transport and all things related to aviation in Somalia. The current Minister of Aviation is Mohamed Abdullahi Salad.

See also
 Agriculture in Somalia

References

Government ministries of Somalia